Cousins Island is an island in Casco Bay within the town of Yarmouth in Cumberland County, Maine, United States. It is listed as a census-designated place, with a population of 490 as of the 2010 census. The CDP is part of the Portland–South Portland–Biddeford, Maine Metropolitan Statistical Area.

The island is connected to mainland Yarmouth by the Ellis C. Snodgrass Memorial Bridge (colloquially known as the Cousins Island Bridge), built in 1955. It is also connected to Chebeague Island by a 15-minute ferry ride on the Chebeague Transportation Company's ferry, the Islander. The island's southwestern peninsula is the site of the Wyman Energy Center, an oil-fired electric power plant capable of producing up to 823 megawatts of electricity. Wyman is a peaking power plant, which means it is fired up to operate only during times of high electricity demand in the region, such as hot summer days.  The Wyman Energy Center also includes a lithium-ion battery grid energy storage system which was the largest and the first of its kind in New England at the time of commissioning.  The battery is designed to provide ISO-New England an option for handling the continual changes in electricity supply and demand.

The island, Cousins River and Littlejohn Island (collectively known at the time as the Hogg Islands) are named after Englishman John Cousins (–1682), who emigrated from Marlborough, Wiltshire. He became the owner of Cousins Island in 1645 after purchasing it from Richard Vines, Steward General and councillor for Sir Ferdinando Gorges.  Two years later, he sold approximately half of it to Richard Bray, who settled there with William Wise.

Geography

Demographics

See also 
 List of islands of Maine

References

External links

Landforms of Yarmouth, Maine
Census-designated places in Maine
Portland metropolitan area, Maine
Census-designated places in Cumberland County, Maine
Islands of Cumberland County, Maine
Islands of Casco Bay
Islands of Maine